Cyndi Nance is Dean Emeritus and the Nathan G. Gordon Professor of Law at the University of Arkansas School of Law.  She has taught at Arkansas since 1994 and served as the dean of the law school from 2006 to 2011.  Her scholarship focuses on labor and employment law.

Nance also serves on the board of directors for Northwest Arkansas's annual Bikes, Blues, and BBQ charity motorcycle rally.

Education 

Nance received her B.S. degree from Chicago State University, followed by a J.D. and a M.A. from the University of Iowa College of Law and College of Business, respectively.

Selected works

Articles 

 The Value of a Law Degree, Iowa Law Review (2011)
 Why Labor and Employment Ethics?, Northern Kentucky Law Review (2006)
 Ethical Issues of Dealing with Unrepresented Parties in Mediation, The Practical Litigator (2005)
 Colorable Claims: The Continuing Significance of Color under Title VII Forty Years after Its Passage, Berkeley Journal of Employment & Labor Law (2005)
 From Widgets to Digits: Reimagining Protective Workplace Policy; A Review of Katherine Stone’s, From Widgets to Digits: Employment Regulation for the Changing Workplace, Employee Rights & Employment Policy Journal (2005)
 Unrepresented Parties in Mediation, Practical Litigator (2004)
 Spoliation of Evidence in Employment Law Cases, Brandeis Law Journal (2004)

Recognition 

 Former Chair of the Association of American Law Schools Labor and Employment Law and Employment Discrimination Sections
 Member of the American Bar Association House of Delegates
 Member of the American Bar Association Center for Racial and Ethnic Diversity
 Member of the American Bar Association’s Labor and Employment Law Section Council
 Member of the Diversity Commission for the Arkansas Bar Association (1995 to present)
 Member of the Law School Admission Council Board
 Chair of the Law School Admission Council's Finance and Legal Affairs Committee

References

External links
Faculty page

Year of birth missing (living people)
Living people
University of Arkansas School of Law faculty
Chicago State University alumni
University of Iowa College of Law alumni